Arne Sorenson or Sørensen may refer to:

 Arne Sorenson (hotel executive) (1958–2021), CEO of Marriott International
 Arne Sorensen (sport shooter) (1934–2018), Canadian sports shooter
 Arne Haugen Sørensen (born 1932), Danish painter and illustrator
 Arne Sørensen (Danish footballer) (1917–1977), Danish football player and coach
 Arne Sørensen (Norwegian footballer) (1911—1995)
 Arne Sørensen (politician) (1906–1978), Danish politician and author